The Forecasting Division of Western Norway is a department of the Norwegian Meteorological Institute located in Bergen. It was established in 1918. It prepares weather forecasting for the area between Nord-Trøndelag and Lista, as well as the fishing grounds around The British Isles and Iceland.

References

1918 establishments in Norway
Organisations based in Bergen
Norwegian Meteorological Institute